Exercise Balikatan is the most prominent annual military exercise between the Philippines and the United States. The Tagalog word balikatan means "shoulder-to-shoulder". The exercises have been the cornerstone of Philippines–United States military relations since the closure of U.S. bases in the Philippines.

Australian armed forces have participated in Balikatan exercises annually since 2014. Australia has a visiting forces agreement, a type of a status of forces agreement, with the Philippines called Philippines–Australia Status of Visiting Forces Agreement. The Philippines is open to other allied countries participating provided that they too have a similar forces agreement.

Background
The U.S. acquired the Philippines after the Spanish–American War of 1898 and the subsequent Philippine–American War.  The United States granted the Philippines independence in 1946. In 1951, the governments of the United States and the Philippines signed the Mutual Defense Treaty to "strengthen the fabric of peace" in the Pacific by agreeing to defend each other's territory in the case of external attack. In line with this treaty, the United States maintained until 1992 several military bases in the Philippines, including U.S. Naval Base Subic Bay and the Clark Air Base.

In 1998, following the bases' closure, the Visiting Forces Agreement (Philippines – United States) (VFA) was signed which contained guidelines for the conduct and protection of American troops visiting the Philippines and stipulated the terms and conditions for the American military to enter Philippine territory. The VFA is a reciprocal agreement in that also outlines the requirements for Philippine troops visiting the United States.

The Visiting Forces Agreement led to the establishment of the Balikatan exercises, as well as a variety of other cooperative measures.

Operations
The Balikatan exercises are designed to maintain and develop the security relationship between the two countries' armed forces through crisis-action planning, through enhanced training to conduct counterterrorism operations, and through promoting interoperability of the forces.

Over the years the exercises have expanded to include surrounding other countries in Southeast Asia. The training has also had a shifting focus. During the U.S.-led "War on Terror" the annual Balikatan Exercises focused on training for counterterrorism missions. There has been some controversy over these exercises; a growing number of Philippine people are angry over the continued presence of U.S. troops in the Philippines.

These military exercises contribute directly to the Philippine armed forces' efforts to root out Abu Sayyaf and Jemaah Islamiyah and bring development to formerly insurgent-held areas, notably Basilan and Jolo. They include not only combined military training but also civil-military operations and humanitarian projects. The International Military Education and Training (IMET) program is the largest in the Pacific and the third-largest in the world, and a Mutual Logistics Support Agreement (MLSA) was signed in November 2002.

Balikatan 2022 
The 2022 Balikatan exercise (Bailkatan 22) brought together over 5,100 US military personnel and 3,800 Filipino soldiers for training in maritime security, amphibious operations, live-fire training, urban operations, aviation operations, counterterrorism, humanitarian assistance, and disaster relief in various parts of Luzon from March 28 to April 8 of the said year. The exercise also includes a command post exercise that tests the AFP and U.S. forces’ ability to plan, command, and communicate with each other in a simulated environment.  This training also bolster the collective security and defensive capabilities of the alliance. Renovation of elementary schools, community health initiatives, and the exchange of advanced emergency rescue and lifesaving techniques were among the collaborative efforts. 

"Balikatan" is a Tagalog term that means "shoulder-to-shoulder" or "sharing the load together," which characterizes the spirit of the exercise and symbolizes the Philippines-US friendship. "Balikatan 22 coincides with the 75th anniversary of US-Philippine security cooperation and a shared commitment to promoting peace," Maj. Gen. Bargeron stated. “Our alliance remains a key source of strength and stability in the Indo-Pacific region.” 

Exercises like Balikatan help to strengthen international alliances and the participating militaries' abilities to respond quickly to emergencies in the Indo-Pacific.

See also

 Philippines geostrategy
 Operation Enduring Freedom – Philippines
 Enhanced Defense Cooperation Agreement
 Operation Balikatan (2003)

 Regional geostrategy
 Belt and Road Initiative
 China containment policy
 China-United States relations
 Quadrilateral Security Dialogue
 Malabar (naval exercise)
 List of disputed territories of China
 String of Pearls (Indian Ocean)
 Territorial disputes in the South China Sea

References

External links

 Official Facebook page

Military exercises involving the United States
Military alliances involving the Philippines
Military alliances involving the United States
United States military in the Philippines
Philippines–United States relations
21st-century military alliances